Koha Ditore (trans. Daily Time) is the leading daily newspaper in Kosovo. It is published by Koha Group and was founded and owned by politician Veton Surroi. His sister Flaka Surroi is now the publisher, following Veton Surroi's launch of his political career within the ORA reformist party. The newspaper initially published as a weekly magazine Koha, that ran from 1992 to 1994, becoming a leading weekly magazine in Kosovo. The initial team included new generation of opinion-makers such as Ylber Hysa, Baton Haxhiu, Dukagjin Gorani, Eqrem Basha, Shkelzen Maliqi, etc. The newspaper with the same name was published for the first time in 1997. Its current editor in chief is Agron Bajrami. 

On Saturday, March 31, 2007, Koha Ditore distributed a free jubilee edition celebrating 10 years since its first issue. In all opinion polls conducted in Kosovo since 1999, Koha Ditore resulted as the most read newspaper. According to the last poll conducted in February 2008, Koha Ditore is read by 30% of Kosovo readers, 13% more than the second most read newspaper. 

The newspaper is generally considered independent, however issues of conflict of interest were raised when the founder of the newspaper Veton Surroi entered local politics in Kosovo.

In 2012, US Ambassador to Kosovo, Christopher Dell, accused the newspaper of promoting the political aspirations of Veton Surroi. Dell referred to events in early 2011 when Kosovo did not have any president and Surroi, a long-time friend of the ambassador, was in talks with Kosovo's Prime Minister, Hashim Thaci, and Dell to be proposed as Kosovo's new president. According to Dell, during these time the newspaper that usually has been a fierce critic of the Thaci-government, quit criticizing the government. When the plans changed and Behgjet Pacolli was elected president, the newspaper launched a series of articles against both the ambassador and Pacolli. Among other things Koha Ditore published pictures of SMS-messages taken during the parliamentary session when the president was elected showing that Dell was influencing the election of the president. Dell claimed media was violating his privacy while Koha Ditore claimed the ambassador wanted to censor them and limit freedom of speech. Surroi has confirmed he was positive when asked if he wanted to be president but has accused Dell of exaggerating and spreading rumours when describing the events. Koha Ditore has answered that the newspaper is not edited by Veton Surroi but by his sister Flaka Surroi, and that the newspaper was doing its job when they published the SMS-messages.

See also
List of newspapers in Kosovo
Koha Ditore - online edition

References

Newspapers published in Kosovo
Newspapers established in 1997
Mass media in Pristina